The Green Party (SZ) leadership election of 2022 was held on 29 January 2022. The incumbents Magdalena Davis and Michal Berg were elected for another term.

Background and election
Magdalena Davis and Michal Berg led Green Party since 2020. The party received 0.99% under their leadership during 2021 Czech legislative election. Both Davis and Berg decided to run for reelection. They were the only candidates.

Election was held on 29 January 2022. Davis received 142 of 170 votes while Berg received 153 votes. They were elected for another term.

Voting

Female

Male

References

Green Party (Czech Republic) leadership elections
Green Party leadership election
Green Party (Czech Republic) leadership election
Indirect elections
Green Party (Czech Republic) leadership election